Sarawat Aara Khanam Halwaini is a Nepalese politician, belonging to the Nepali Congress currently serving as the member of the 1st Federal Parliament of Nepal. In the 2017 Nepalese general election he was elected as a proportional representative from Muslim category.

References

Nepal MPs 2017–2022
Living people
Nepali Congress politicians from Lumbini Province
Nepalese Muslims
1963 births